NAA or Naa may refer to:

People
 Naa Ashorkor (born 1988), Ghanaian actress and radio/ TV broadcaster
 Naa Govindasamy (1946–1999), Singaporean Tamil-language writer and computer font developer
 Naa Someswara, Indian science writer and TV presenter

Businesses and organizations

Airports and aviation
 Narita International Airport Corporation, Japan
 Narrabri Airport (IATA code NAA), New South Wales, Australia
 National Aeronautic Association, US
 National Aviation Academy, training school in the US
 National aviation authority or civil aviation authority, in each country
 North American Airlines, founded 1989, ceased operations 2014
 North American Aviation, major US aerospace manufacturer from 1928 to 1967
 Norwegian Air Argentina, an Argentinian airline

In other fields
 National Academy of Arbitrators, US and Canada
 National Academy of Arts, Bulgaria
 National Anthropological Archives of the Smithsonian Institution, US
 National Archives of Australia
 National Assessment Agency, in the UK Department for Education and Skills
 National Association of Actors, a Mexican television and motion picture performers union
 National Auctioneers Association, US
 Negro American Association, US baseball minor Negro league
 Newspaper Association of America, a trade association
 Nigerian Accounting Association
 North American Arms, an arms company

In science and technology
 1-Naphthaleneacetic acid, a synthetic auxin (organic compound and plant hormone)
 N-Acetylaspartic acid, a neurochemical often imaged in magnetic resonance spectroscopy
 Neutron activation analysis, a nuclear process used for determining the concentrations of elements in materials
 Nicotinamide, also called niacinamide, the amide of nicotinic acid
 No abstract available bias, an academic tendency to preferentially cite journal articles that have an abstract available online
 Nucleic acid amplification, a molecular biology technique for replicating segments of DNA
 Network Address Authority, iSCSI terminology

Other uses
 National Arabic Alphabets, in the Unicode standard
 VLF Transmitter Cutler (call-sign NAA), a radio station in Cutler, Maine, operated by the United States Navy
 NAA (Arlington, Virginia) a Navy radio facility located in Arlington, Virginia from 1913 to 1941